Gynautocera papilionaria is a moth of the family Zygaenidae. It is found in south-east Asia, including northern India, Thailand, Laos, Assam, Burma, Vietnam, Tonkin, Hainan, Sumatra, Java, Lombok, Celebes, Amboina, Buru and Batjan.

The wingspan is about 72 mm. It is a day-flying species.

Larvae have been recorded on Litsea monopetala.

External links
Species info

Chalcosiinae
Moths described in 1831